Entoloma flavostipitatum  is a fungus in belonging to the broad genus Entoloma. The name "flavostipitatum" is constructed using Latin, with "flavo" meaning "yellow", it refers to the mushroom's yellow stipe. The sporocarp has a light brown cap, yellow subdecurrent gills, a smooth yellow stipe, and contains basidiospores with sizes ranging from 6.5 to 8.5 × 5.5–7.5 µm. Additionally, it contains yellowish-brown cystidia with sizes of range 30–44 × 6–8.5 µm. It was discovered in Kerala, India by researchers.

See also 
 List of Entoloma species

References

External links 
 

Entolomataceae
Fungi of India
Fungi described in 2016